Kalinchowk is a Rural municipality located within the Dolakha district of the Bagmati province of Nepal. The municipality spans  of area, with a total population of 22,954 according to a 2011 Nepal census.

On March 10, 2017, the Government of Nepal restructured the local level bodies into 753 new local level structures. The previous Kalinchowk, Babare, Lamidanda, Lapilang, Sunakhani, and Sundrawati VDCs were merged to form Kalinchowk Rural Municipality. Kalinchowk is divided into 9 wards, with Sunakhani declared the administrative center of the rural municipality.

Kalinchowk is a hill station and a tourist hotspot. It is located at 3842 meters of altitude and about 150km northeast from national capital Kathmandu. The place is best known for trekking and skiing. During the December, January and February (mainly Paush and Magh in Nepali months) snowfalls in Kalinchowk.

Kalinchowk VDC
Kalinchowk is now a neighborhood (village) within Kalinchowk Rural Municipality. It was a separate village development committee (VDC) from 1990 to 2017. Kalinchowk village had  of area and population according to 2011 had 2806 with 458 individual households. This whole village is now a ward (ward no. 1) of Kalinchowk RM.

Ward division
Kalinchowk RM divided into 9 wards as below:

Photo gallery

See also
Kalinchowk Bhagwati Shrine

References

External links
official website of the rural municipality

UN map of the municipalities of Dolakha District

Rural municipalities in Dolakha District
Rural municipalities of Nepal established in 2017